Highgate Harriers are a UK Athletics club based in North London. Their home track is Parliament Hill, London Athletics track and is not to be confused with Highgate Stadium. They compete in the Southern Athletics League Division 2 East and the Metropolitan Cross Country League.

Night of the 10,000 metres PBs 
Since 2013, Highgate Harriers have hosted a track competition for solely 10,000 metre races. The event is usually held mid-late May/early June and from 2014 the English Championships for 10,000 metres were incorporated in the event. From 2016 the British Athletics Championships were also held as part of the competition.

Editions

History
Highgate Harriers was founded in 1879.

Honours

Senior Men:
 Metropolitan Cross Country League
 Champions: 2013, 2014, 2015, 2016, 2017, 2018, 2019, 2020
Liddiard Trophy
 Champions: 2012, 2013, 2014, 2015, 2016 
 South of England Cross Country Championships
 Champions: 1997, 2012, 2016, 2017
 2nd place: 2013
 3rd place: 2015, 2020
 South of England Cross Country Relays
 2nd place: 2019
 South of England 6 Stage Road Relays
 Champions: 1990, 2015, 2017
 National 6 Stage Road Relays
 2nd place: 2014
 National 12 Stage Road Relays
 Champions: 2016
U15 Boys:
 LICC Highest High Jump
 Champions: 2022

Senior Women:
 Metropolitan Cross Country League
 Champions: 2003, 2004, 2005, 2006, 2007, 2008, 2009, 2016, 2017
 English National Cross Country Championships
 3rd place: 2017
 South of England Cross Country Championships
 Champions: 2020

Notable athletes

Olympians

Club kit 
The men compete in a vest with hooped black and white horizontal stripes, with the word Highgate on the chest. Women wear a vest with a black upper half and a white lower half, also with the word Highgate, in white lettering on the upper half.

References

External links
Club Website
Parliament Athletics Track UK Running Track Directory

Athletics clubs in London